RBB or rbb may refer to:

Banking 
Rastriya Banijya Bank, the largest commercial bank in Nepal
Westpac Retail and Business Banking, a business unit of Australian bank Westpac

Broadcasting 
Rundfunk Berlin-Brandenburg, a national broadcaster for the German states of Berlin and Brandenburg
Radio Broadcasting Board, precursor to the Philippine Broadcasting Service

Sports 
Red Bull Barako (later Barako Bull Energy Boosters), a Philippine professional basketball team 
Red Bull Brasil, a Brazilian football club located in Campinas, São Paulo
Red and Black Bloc, supporters of Western Sydney Wanderers FC

Music 
RBB (EP), a 2018 EP by South Korean girl group Red Velvet
 "RBB (Really Bad Boy)", song from that EP

Other uses 
Richard Boyd Barrett (born 1967), Irish politician
Richland-Bean Blossom Community School Corporation, in Monroe County, Indiana, US
Rigid buoyant boat, a type of light-weight boat
Rock Band Blitz, a video game released in 2012
Rügensche Bäderbahn, a narrow gauge railway in Mecklenburg-Vorpommern, Germany
Borba Airport, Borba, Amazonas, Brazil (IATA code RBB)
Rumai dialect of the Palaung language (ISO code rbb)

See also
RBBS (disambiguation)